Cinquantenaire may refer to:

 Golden jubilee (50th anniversary) the meaning of cinquantenaire
 1880 half-century anniversary of the 1830 Belgian Revolution
 Cinquantenaire Park, Brussels, Belgium
 Cinquantenaire Arcade, Brussels, Belgium
 Cinquantenaire Museum, Brussels, Belgium
 Cinquantenaire Hospital of Kinshasa, DRC (Zaire)

See also

 
 

Disambiguation pages